Rainbow Warrior(s), rainbow warrior(s), or Warriors of the Rainbow may refer to

Arts and entertainment

Books
Warriors of the Rainbow (1962), an evangelical religious tract by William Willoya and Vinson Brown, that inspired the Legend of the Rainbow Warriors, a fakelore environmentalist belief of fulfilling a Native American prophecy

Film and television
 The Rainbow Warrior (film), 1992, about the Greenpeace ship
 Warriors of the Rainbow: Seediq Bale, 2011 Taiwanese film
 "The Rainbow Warrior", an episode from season 2 of He-Man and the Masters of the Universe

Music
 "Rainbow Warrior", song by Bleak House, notable for inspiring "Welcome Home (Sanitarium)" by Metallica
"Rainbow Warrior", song by The Buggles on their album Adventures in Modern Recording
 "Rainbow Warrior", song by Cobalt 60 on their album Twelve

Video games
 Rainbow Warrior (video game), 1989 videogame developed by Greenpeace

Ships
 Rainbow Warrior (1955), former fishing trawler Sir William Hardy, acquired by Greenpeace in 1978 and sunk by the French intelligence service in 1985
 Sinking of the Rainbow Warrior, in 1985
 Rainbow Warrior (1957), auxiliary three-masted schooner, acquired by Greenpeace in 1989
 Rainbow Warrior (2011), purpose-designed Greenpeace ship

Sports
 Hawaii Rainbow Warriors, sports teams at the University of Hawai'i at Mānoa
 The Rainbow Warriors or Rainbow Warrior, nickname for Jeff Gordon's auto racing team or car

Other uses
 Rainbow Warrior, self-description of executed murderer Joseph Mitchell Parsons (referring to Jeff Gordon)
 Rainbow warrior, nickname for Swedish human rights activist Linnéa Claeson

See also
 Rainbow Family
 Rainbow flag
 Rainbow Gathering
 "Rainbowarriors", song by American band CocoRosie on their 2007 album The Adventures of Ghosthorse and Stillborn